Flyer Indústria Aeronáutica, Eireli. is a Brazilian manufacturer of ultralight aircraft based in Sumaré, São Paulo, founded in 1983 by the siblings Nelson Luiz Gonçalves and Luiz Claudio Gonçalves.

The company has already produced more than 3,000 aircraft and has established itself as the largest assembler of ultralight aircraft in Brazil, becoming a reference in Brazilian aviation.

History
The company was founded on May 16, 1983 by the siblings Nelson Luiz Gonçalves and Luiz Claudio Gonçalves, who worked together with Homer Kolb on the further development of the Kolb Flyer, the Kolb Flyer Super Sport. The company stood out from the start with the design and production of the Flyer GT, selling over 750 units.

Flyer Indústria Aeronáutica also manufactures or manufactured various models of other manufacturers under license and acts as exclusive distributor for Tecnam in Brazil.

Products 
Ultralight Aircraft
F600NG
Pelican 500BR (Under license of Ultravia)

Light Sport Aircraft
RV-7 (Under license of Van's Aircraft)
RV-9 (Under license of Van's Aircraft)
RV-10 (Under license of Van's Aircraft)
RV-12 (Under license of Van's Aircraft)
RV-14 (Under license of Van's Aircraft)

See also
New Kolb Aircraft
Van's Aircraft
Tecnam
Companhia Aeronáutica Paulista

Literature
Tacke, W. Hrsg.: Flügel Welt Index, 2017–18, 2017, Flying Pages, EAN 4194047409950

References

External links
 Flyer website

Aerospace companies of Brazil
Aircraft manufacturers of Brazil
Companies based in São Paulo (state)
Manufacturing companies established in 1983
1983 establishments in Brazil
Brazilian brands